Jespersen's Cycle is a series of processes in historical linguistics, which describe the historical development of the expression of negation in a variety of languages, from a simple pre-verbal marker of negation, through a discontinuous marker (elements both before and after the verb) and in some cases through subsequent loss of the original pre-verbal marker. The pattern was formulated in Otto Jespersen's 1917 book Negation in English and Other Languages, and named after him in Swedish linguist Östen Dahl's 1979 article Typology of Sentence Negation.

Introduction

The linguist Otto Jespersen began his book with the words:

The process has since been described for many languages in many different families, and is particularly noticeable in languages which are currently at stage II (both the original and the additional word obligatory) such as French, Welsh, and some dialects of Arabic and Berber.

The fact that different languages can be seen to be in different stages of the process, and that sometimes, as Jespersen says, the whole process can begin again after renewal, prompted Dahl to name the process "Jespersen's cycle". The observation was however made earlier, most noticeably by Antoine Meillet, who used the term 'spiral'.

The process

There are three stages, labelled I, II and III:

In Stage I, negation is expressed by a single pre-verbal element:

In Stage II both a preverbal and a postverbal element are obligatory:

In Stage III the original preverbal element becomes optional or is lost altogether:

Examples

French is well known to use a bipartite negative, e.g. : "I don't know", . (The second negative element originally had a semantic connection with the verb:  originally meant "I don't walk a step".) Welsh has a very similar pattern, . In both languages, the colloquial register is at a more advanced stage in the cycle, and the first part ( or ) is very frequently omitted. In formal Welsh registers, by contrast,  tends to be used without . 'no matter what/anything') and with certain verbs (e.g. 'She doesn't stop talking').

Modern English’s do-support and contraction of “do not” to “don’t” in colloquial speech could be argued as moving English back toward Stage I of Jespersen’s Cycle—“I didn’t see”.

Palestinian Arabic creates negation through suffixation (e.g.  'I don't know' ) which comes from an earlier/alternate form of ( 'I don't know' ).

Central Atlas Tamazight, a Berber language spoken principally in Central Morocco, uses a bipartite negative construction (e.g.  'he didn't go out' — the underlined elements together convey the negative) which apparently was modeled after proximate Arabic varieties.

The Chamic languages, spoken in parts of Cambodia, Vietnam, and Hainan, may also be undergoing Jespersen's cycle.

Italian and the various Italian regional languages are also undergoing a similar transformation, where all three stages can be seen in action at once: The standard language is generally at stage I, with e.g. 'I haven't told him/her', and this form is also customary in colloquial language. The word  originally means '(pieces of) soft inside of bread' or 'crumb', similarly to more standard ; it then grammaticalised in the meaning 'a little, (in) the least'. It is part of a series of words used in various registers, dialects and time periods in this same context, like e.g. 'point' or  '(small) step' (like in French), or also , originally 'in fact, at all', now generally perceived with a negative valence: Non gliel'ho punto detto, Non gliel'ho passo detto, Non gliel'ho detto affatto.

References

Bibliography 

 
 Hansen, Maj-Britt Mosegaard, and Jacqueline Visconti (eds.). 2014. The diachrony of negation. Amsterdam/Philadelphia: John Benjamins. 
 Willis, David, Christopher Lucas, and Anne Breitbarth (eds.). 2013. The history of negation in the languages of Europe and the Mediterranean, Volume I: Case studies. Oxford: Oxford University Press. 
 Breitbarth, Anne, David Willis, and Christopher Lucas (eds.). 2020. The history of negation in the languages of Europe and the Mediterranean, Volume II: Patterns and processes. Oxford: Oxford University Press. 

1917 introductions
1979 neologisms
Historical linguistics